Ovchinnikov is a Russian surname and may refer to:

Andrei Aleksandrovich Ovchinnikov (b. 1986), Russian footballer
Nikolai Ovchinnikov (1918–2004), a Soviet painter
Sergei Ovchinnikov (b. 1970), a Russian football goalkeeper
Vladimir Ovchinnikov (b. 1958), a Russian pianist
Vladimir Ovchinnikov (b. 1970), a Russian javelin thrower
Vsevolod Ovchinnikov (1926–2021), a Soviet journalist and author of well-known books A Branch of Sakura and The Roots of an Oak-Tree.
Vyacheslav Ovchinnikov (1936–2019), a Soviet composer
Yuri Ovchinnikov (biochemist) (1934–1988), a Soviet bioorganic chemist

Russian-language surnames